"Life Goes On" is a power ballad by the Italian singer Elisa, included in her album Pearl Days. The ballad was also released in Italian as "Una poesia anche per te",  but the lyrics in Italian aren't the "Life Goes On" translation.

Background
The song, produced by Glen Ballard, is dedicated to the late Elisa's grandfather.

Chart performance
"Una poesia anche per te" was released as a single on 15 April 2005. It sold 21,000 copies in Italy in 2005.

Track listing
Una poesia anche per te (Life goes on) - 5:14 - (E. Toffoli)
The Waves - 4:10 - (E. Toffoli)

References

2000s ballads
2005 singles
Elisa (Italian singer) songs
Songs written by Elisa (Italian singer)
Italian-language songs
Commemoration songs
Rock ballads
Song recordings produced by Glen Ballard
Sugar Music singles
2004 songs